The Unitarian Universalist Church of Medford and The Osgood House are a historic Unitarian Universalist church building and parsonage house at 141 and 147 High Street in Medford, Massachusetts.

History
The congregation was founded in 1690 as a Puritan parish church that was an official branch of the Massachusetts state church. In 1696 the first meeting house was constructed. In the early 1820s the congregation split and was restructured with the 'orthodox' Trinitarian members leaving to form a separate congregation. The current and fifth building of the congregation was constructed in 1894 and added to the National Register of Historic Places in 1975.

The Rev. William Ellery Channing gave his first sermon at 1st Parish Medford, on August 8, 1802 "Silver and gold have I none, but such I give to you." The Rev. Thomas Starr King did his student ministry under Hosea Ballou II at 1st Universalist before Ballou moved to become the first president of Tufts College in 1852.

The First Universalist Church and the Hillside Universalist consolidated with the First Parish Church (Unitarian) in 1961 to form The Unitarian Universalist Church of Medford (or UU Medford) a member congregation of the Unitarian Universalist Association, and has been a Welcoming Congregation since 1996.

Architecture
The church, built in 1893-94, is one of Medford's finest examples of Late Gothic Revival architecture.  It was designed by J. Merrill Brown, a Boston architect who had worked in the practices of H.H. Richardson and Peabody and Stearns.  The builders were the Dodge Brothers, a regionally prominent building firm specializing in religious buildings.  The former parsonage, now housing other church facilities, was built in 1785 for the Reverend David Osgood, and is a fine example of Federal period architecture.

Famous members
George Luther Stearns
Lydia Maria Child
Fannie Farmer
Rev. John Pierpont
James Pierpont
Robert D. Richardson
Samuel C. Lawrence
Gov. John Brooks
Rev. Hosea Ballou II
Rev. Clarence Skinner

List of Ministers

See also
National Register of Historic Places listings in Medford, Massachusetts
National Register of Historic Places listings in Middlesex County, Massachusetts

References

Further reading
Alan Seaburg. The First Universalist Church of Medford, Massachusetts. Billerica: Anne Miniver Press, 2013

External links
UU Medford Congregation Website
Parson Turell's Legacy
Turell's sugarbowl
 Records pertaining to the Unitarian Universalist Church of Medford are in the Andover-Harvard Theological Library at Harvard Divinity School in Cambridge, Massachusetts.
 Annual Reports, 1984/1985-1990/1991
 First Universalist Church In Medford. Record Book, 1905-1910
 Second Universalist Parish in Medford, Massachusetts. Records, 1889-1894

Churches on the National Register of Historic Places in Massachusetts
Unitarian Universalist churches in Massachusetts
Churches completed in 1894
19th-century Unitarian Universalist church buildings
Churches in Middlesex County, Massachusetts
Buildings and structures in Medford, Massachusetts
Stone churches in Massachusetts
National Register of Historic Places in Medford, Massachusetts